Yury Yermolenko (born 13 April 1967) is a Russian sports shooter. He competed in the men's 10 metre running target event at the 1996 Summer Olympics.

References

External links
 

1967 births
Living people
Russian male sport shooters
Olympic shooters of Russia
Shooters at the 1996 Summer Olympics
People from Belgorod
Sportspeople from Belgorod Oblast